Saul Aaron Kripke (November 13, 1940 – September 15, 2022) was an American analytic philosopher and logician. He was Distinguished Professor of Philosophy at the Graduate Center of the City University of New York and emeritus professor at Princeton University. Kripke is considered one of the most important philosophers of the latter half of the 20th century. Since the 1960s, he has been a central figure in a number of fields related to mathematical and modal logic, philosophy of language and mathematics, metaphysics, epistemology, and recursion theory.  

Kripke made influential and original contributions to logic, especially modal logic. His principal contribution is a semantics for modal logic involving possible worlds, now called Kripke semantics. He received the 2001 Schock Prize in Logic and Philosophy.

Kripke was also partly responsible for the revival of metaphysics and essentialism after the decline of logical positivism, claiming necessity is a metaphysical notion distinct from the epistemic notion of a priori, and that there are necessary truths that are known a posteriori, such as that water is H2O. A 1970 Princeton lecture series, published in book form in 1980 as Naming and Necessity, is considered one of the most important philosophical works of the 20th century. It introduces the concept of names as rigid designators, true in every possible world, as contrasted with descriptions. It also contains Kripke's causal theory of reference, disputing the descriptivist theory found in Gottlob Frege's concept of sense and Bertrand Russell's theory of descriptions.

Kripke also gave an original reading of Ludwig Wittgenstein, known as "Kripkenstein", in his Wittgenstein on Rules and Private Language. The book contains his rule-following argument, a paradox for skepticism about meaning. Much of his work remains unpublished or exists only as tape recordings and privately circulated manuscripts.

Life and career
Saul Kripke was the oldest of three children born to Dorothy K. Kripke and Rabbi Myer S. Kripke. His father was the leader of Beth El Synagogue, the only Conservative congregation in Omaha, Nebraska; his mother wrote educational Jewish books for children. Saul and his two sisters, Madeline and Netta, attended Dundee Grade School and Omaha Central High School. Kripke was labeled a prodigy, teaching himself Ancient Hebrew by the age of six, reading Shakespeare's complete works by nine, and mastering the works of Descartes and complex mathematical problems before finishing elementary school. He wrote his first completeness theorem in modal logic at 17, and had it published a year later. After graduating from high school in 1958, Kripke attended Harvard University and graduated summa cum laude in 1962 with a bachelor's degree in mathematics. During his sophomore year at Harvard, he taught a graduate-level logic course at nearby MIT. Upon graduation he received a Fulbright Fellowship, and in 1963 was appointed to the Society of Fellows. Kripke later said, "I wish I could have skipped college. I got to know some interesting people but I can't say I learned anything. I probably would have learned it all anyway just reading on my own."

After briefly teaching at Harvard, Kripke moved in 1968 to Rockefeller University in New York City, where he taught until 1976. In 1978 he took a chaired professorship at Princeton University. In 1988 he received the university's Behrman Award for distinguished achievement in the humanities. In 2002 Kripke began teaching at the CUNY Graduate Center, and in 2003 he was appointed a distinguished professor of philosophy there.

Kripke has received honorary degrees from the University of Nebraska, Omaha (1977), Johns Hopkins University (1997), University of Haifa, Israel (1998), and the University of Pennsylvania (2005). He was a member of the American Philosophical Society and an elected Fellow of the American Academy of Arts and Sciences, and in 1985 was a Corresponding Fellow of the British Academy. He won the Schock Prize in Logic and Philosophy in 2001.

Kripke was married to philosopher Margaret Gilbert. He is the second cousin once removed of television writer, director, and producer Eric Kripke.

Kripke died of pancreatic cancer on September 15, 2022, in Plainsboro, New Jersey, at the age of 81.

Work

Kripke's contributions to philosophy include:

 Kripke semantics for modal and related logics, published in several essays beginning in his teens.
 His 1970 Princeton lectures Naming and Necessity (published in 1972 and 1980), which significantly restructured philosophy of language.
 His interpretation of Wittgenstein.
 His theory of truth.

He has also contributed to recursion theory (see admissible ordinal and Kripke–Platek set theory).

Modal logic
Two of Kripke's earlier works, "A Completeness Theorem in Modal Logic" (1959) and "Semantical Considerations on Modal Logic" (1963), the former written when he was a teenager, were on modal logic. The most familiar logics in the modal family are constructed from a weak logic called K, named after Kripke. Kripke introduced the now-standard Kripke semantics (also known as relational semantics or frame semantics) for modal logics. Kripke semantics is a formal semantics for non-classical logic systems. It was first made for modal logics, and later adapted to intuitionistic logic and other non-classical systems. The discovery of Kripke semantics was a breakthrough in the making of non-classical logics, because the model theory of such logics was absent before Kripke.

A Kripke frame or modal frame is a pair , where W is a non-empty set, and R is a binary relation on W. Elements of W are called nodes or worlds, and R is known as the accessibility relation.  Depending on the properties of the accessibility relation (transitivity, reflexivity, etc.), the corresponding frame is described, by extension, as being transitive, reflexive, etc.

  if and only if ,
  if and only if  implies .

We read  as "w satisfies A", "A is satisfied in w", or "w forces A". The relation  is called the satisfaction relation, evaluation, or forcing relation. The satisfaction relation is uniquely determined by its value on propositional variables.

A formula A is valid in:

 a model , if  for all w ∈ W,
 a class C of frames or models, if it is valid in every member of C.

We define Thm(C) to be the set of all formulas that are valid in C. Conversely, if X is a set of formulas, let Mod(X) be the class of all frames which validate every formula from X.

A modal logic (i.e., a set of formulas) L is sound with respect to a class of frames C, if L ⊆ Thm(C). L is complete with respect to C if L ⊇ Thm(C).

Semantics is useful for investigating a logic (i.e., a derivation system) only if the semantical entailment relation reflects its syntactical counterpart, the consequence relation (derivability). It is vital to know which modal logics are sound and complete with respect to a class of Kripke frames, and for them, to determine which class it is.

For any class C of Kripke frames, Thm(C) is a normal modal logic (in particular, theorems of the minimal normal modal logic, K, are valid in every Kripke model). However, the converse does not hold generally. There are Kripke incomplete normal modal logics, which is unproblematic, because most of the modal systems studied are complete of classes of frames described by simple conditions.

A normal modal logic L corresponds to a class of frames C, if C = Mod(L). In other words, C is the largest class of frames such that L is sound wrt C. It follows that L is Kripke complete if and only if it is complete of its corresponding class.

Consider the schema T : . T is valid in any reflexive frame : if , then  since w R w. On the other hand, a frame which validates T has to be reflexive: fix w ∈ W, and define satisfaction of a propositional variable p as follows:  if and only if w R u. T corresponds to the class of reflexive Kripke frames.

It is often much easier to characterize the corresponding class of L than to prove its completeness, thus correspondence serves as a guide to completeness proofs. Correspondence is also used to show incompleteness of modal logics: suppose L1 ⊆ L2 are normal modal logics that correspond to the same class of frames, but L1 does not prove all theorems of L2. Then L1 is Kripke incomplete. For example, the schema  generates an incomplete logic, as it corresponds to the same class of frames as GL (viz. transitive and converse well-founded frames), but does not prove the GL-tautology .

Canonical models 

For any normal modal logic L, a Kripke model (called the canonical model) can be constructed, which validates precisely the theorems of L, by an adaptation of the standard technique of using maximal consistent sets as models. Canonical Kripke models play a role similar to the Lindenbaum–Tarski algebra construction in algebraic semantics.

A set of formulas is L-consistent if no contradiction can be derived from them using the axioms of L, and modus ponens. A maximal L-consistent set (an L-MCS for short) is an L-consistent set which has no proper L-consistent superset.

  if and only if for every formula , if  then ,
  if and only if .

The canonical model is a model of L, as every L-MCS contains all theorems of L. By Zorn's lemma, each L-consistent set is contained in an L-MCS, in particular every formula unprovable in L has a counterexample in the canonical model.

The main application of canonical models are completeness proofs. Properties of the canonical model of K immediately imply completeness of K with respect to the class of all Kripke frames. This argument does not work for arbitrary L, because there is no guarantee that the underlying frame of the canonical model satisfies the frame conditions of L.

We say that a formula or a set X of formulas is canonical with respect to a property P of Kripke frames, if

 X is valid in every frame which satisfies P,
 for any normal modal logic L which contains X, the underlying frame of the canonical model of L satisfies P.

A union of canonical sets of formulas is itself canonical. It follows from the preceding discussion that any logic axiomatized by a canonical set of formulas is Kripke complete, and compact.

The axioms T, 4, D, B, 5, H, G (and thus any combination of them) are canonical. GL and Grz are not canonical, because they are not compact. The axiom M by itself is not canonical (Goldblatt, 1991), but the combined logic S4.1 (in fact, even K4.1) is canonical.

In general, it is undecidable whether a given axiom is canonical. We know a nice sufficient condition: H. Sahlqvist identified a broad class of formulas (now called Sahlqvist formulas) such that:

 a Sahlqvist formula is canonical,
 the class of frames corresponding to a Sahlqvist formula is first-order definable,
 there is an algorithm which computes the corresponding frame condition to a given Sahlqvist formula.

This is a powerful criterion: for example, all axioms listed above as canonical are (equivalent to) Sahlqvist formulas. A logic has the finite model property (FMP) if it is complete with respect to a class of finite frames. An application of this notion is the decidability question: it follows from Post's theorem that a recursively axiomatized modal logic L which has FMP is decidable, provided it is decidable whether a given finite frame is a model of L. In particular, every finitely axiomatizable logic with FMP is decidable.

There are various methods for establishing FMP for a given logic. Refinements and extensions of the canonical model construction often work, using tools such as filtration or unravelling. As another possibility, completeness proofs based on cut-free sequent calculi usually produce finite models directly.

Most of the modal systems used in practice (including all listed above) have FMP.

In some cases, we can use FMP to prove Kripke completeness of a logic: every normal modal logic is complete wrt a class of modal algebras, and a finite modal algebra can be transformed into a Kripke frame. As an example, Robert Bull proved using this method that every normal extension of S4.3 has FMP, and is Kripke complete.

Kripke semantics has a straightforward generalization to logics with more than one modality. A Kripke frame for a language with
 as the set of its necessity operators consists of a non-empty set W equipped with binary relations Ri for each i ∈ I. The definition of a satisfaction relation is modified as follows:

  if and only if

Carlson models 

A simplified semantics, discovered by Tim Carlson, is often used for polymodal provability logics. A Carlson model is a structure  with a single accessibility relation R, and subsets Di ⊆ W for each modality. Satisfaction is defined as:

  if and only if 

Carlson models are easier to visualize and to work with than usual polymodal Kripke models; there are, however, Kripke complete polymodal logics which are Carlson incomplete.

In Semantical Considerations on Modal Logic, published in 1963, Kripke responded to a difficulty with classical quantification theory. The motivation for the world-relative approach was to represent the possibility that objects in one world may fail to exist in another. But if standard quantifier rules are used, every term must refer to something that exists in all the possible worlds. This seems incompatible with our ordinary practice of using terms to refer to things that exist contingently.

Kripke's response to this difficulty was to eliminate terms. He gave an example of a system that uses the world-relative interpretation and preserves the classical rules. But the costs are severe. First, his language is artificially impoverished, and second, the rules for the propositional modal logic must be weakened.

Kripke's possible worlds theory has been used by narratologists (beginning with Pavel and Dolezel) to understand "reader's manipulation of alternative plot developments, or the characters' planned or fantasized alternative action series." This application has become especially useful in the analysis of hyperfiction.

Intuitionistic logic
Kripke semantics for intuitionistic logic follows the same principles as the semantics of modal logic, but uses a different definition of satisfaction.

An intuitionistic Kripke model is a triple
, where  is a partially ordered Kripke frame, and  satisfies the following conditions:
  if and only if for all ,  implies ,
 not .

Intuitionistic logic is sound and complete with respect to its Kripke semantics, and it has the Finite Model Property.

Intuitionistic first-order logic

Let L be a first-order language. A Kripke model of L is a triple
, where
 is an intuitionistic Kripke frame, Mw is a
(classical) L-structure for each node w ∈ W, and the following compatibility conditions hold whenever u ≤ v:
 the domain of Mu is included in the domain of Mv,
 realizations of function symbols in Mu and Mv agree on elements of Mu,
 for each n-ary predicate P and elements a1,...,an ∈ Mu: if P(a1,...,an) holds in Mu, then it holds in Mv.
Given an evaluation e of variables by elements of Mw, we define the satisfaction relation :
  if and only if  holds in Mw,
  if and only if for all ,  implies ,
 not ,
  if and only if there exists an  such that ,
  if and only if for every  and every , .
Here e(x→a) is the evaluation which gives x the value a, and otherwise agrees with e.

Naming and Necessity

The three lectures that form Naming and Necessity constitute an attack on the descriptivist theory of names. Kripke attributes variants of descriptivist theories to Frege, Russell, Wittgenstein, and John Searle, among others. According to descriptivist theories, proper names either are synonymous with descriptions, or have their reference determined by virtue of the name's being associated with a description or cluster of descriptions that an object uniquely satisfies. Kripke rejects both these kinds of descriptivism. He gives several examples purporting to render descriptivism implausible as a theory of how names get their references determined (e.g., surely Aristotle could have died at age two and so not satisfied any of the descriptions we associate with his name, but it would seem wrong to deny that he was still Aristotle).

As an alternative, Kripke outlined a causal theory of reference, according to which a name refers to an object by virtue of a causal connection with the object as mediated through communities of speakers. He points out that proper names, in contrast to most descriptions, are rigid designators: that is, a proper name refers to the named object in every possible world in which the object exists, while most descriptions designate different objects in different possible worlds. For example, "Richard Nixon" refers to the same person in every possible world in which Nixon exists, while "the person who won the United States presidential election of 1968" could refer to Nixon, Humphrey, or others in different possible worlds.

Kripke also raised the prospect of a posteriori necessities—facts that are necessarily true, though they can be known only through empirical investigation. Examples include "Hesperus is Phosphorus", "Cicero is Tully", "Water is H2O", and other identity claims where two names refer to the same object. According to Kripke, the Kantian distinctions between analytic and synthetic, a priori and a posteriori, and contingent and necessary do not map onto one another. Rather, analytic/synthetic is a semantic distinction, a priori/a posteriori is an epistemic distinction, and contingent/necessary is a metaphysical distinction.

Finally, Kripke gave an argument against identity materialism in the philosophy of mind, the view that every mental particular is identical with some physical particular. Kripke argued that the only way to defend this identity is as an a posteriori necessary identity, but that such an identity—e.g., that pain is C-fibers firing—could not be necessary, given the (clearly conceivable) possibility that pain could be separate from the firing of C-fibers, or the firing of C-fibers be separate from pain. (Similar arguments have since been made by David Chalmers.) In any event, the psychophysical identity theorist, according to Kripke, incurs a dialectical obligation to explain the apparent logical possibility of these circumstances, since according to such theorists they should be impossible.

Kripke delivered the John Locke Lectures in philosophy at Oxford in 1973. Titled Reference and Existence, they were in many respects a continuation of Naming and Necessity, and deal with the subjects of fictional names and perceptual error. In 2013 Oxford University Press published the lectures as a book, also titled Reference and Existence.

In a 1995 paper, philosopher Quentin Smith argued that key concepts in Kripke's new theory of reference originated in the work of Ruth Barcan Marcus more than a decade earlier. Smith identified six significant ideas in the New Theory that he claimed Marcus had developed: (1) that proper names are direct references that do not consist of contained definitions; (2) that while one can single out a single thing by a description, this description is not equivalent to a proper name of this thing; (3) the modal argument that proper names are directly referential, and not disguised descriptions; (4) a formal modal logic proof of the necessity of identity; (5) the concept of a rigid designator, though Kripke coined that term; and (6) a posteriori identity. Smith argued that Kripke failed to understand Marcus's theory at the time but later adopted many of its key conceptual themes in his New Theory of Reference.

Other scholars have subsequently offered detailed responses arguing that no plagiarism occurred.

"A Puzzle about Belief"
Kripke's main propositions about proper names in Naming and Necessity are that the meaning of a name simply is the object it refers to and that a name's referent is determined by a causal link between some sort of "baptism" and the utterance of the name. Nevertheless, he acknowledges the possibility that propositions containing names may have some additional semantic properties, properties that could explain why two names referring to the same person may give different truth values in propositions about beliefs. For example, Lois Lane believes that Superman can fly, although she does not believe that Clark Kent can fly. This can be accounted for if the names "Superman" and "Clark Kent", though referring to the same person, have distinct semantic properties.

But in his article "A Puzzle about Belief" (1988) Kripke seems to oppose even this possibility. His argument can be reconstructed as follows: The idea that two names referring to the same object may have different semantic properties is supposed to explain that coreferring names behave differently in propositions about beliefs (as in Lois Lane's case). But the same phenomenon occurs even with coreferring names that obviously have the same semantic properties: Kripke invites us to imagine a French, monolingual boy, Pierre, who believes that "Londres est jolie" ("London is beautiful"). Pierre moves to London without realizing that London = Londres. He then learns English the same way a child would learn the language, that is, not by translating words from French to English. Pierre learns the name "London" from the unattractive part of the city where he lives, and so comes to believe that London is not beautiful. If Kripke's account is correct, Pierre now believes both that Londres is jolie and that London is not beautiful. This cannot be explained by coreferring names having different semantic properties. According to Kripke, this demonstrates that attributing additional semantic properties to names does not explain what it is intended to.

Wittgenstein

First published in 1982, Kripke's Wittgenstein on Rules and Private Language contends that the central argument of Wittgenstein's Philosophical Investigations centers on a devastating rule-following paradox that undermines the possibility of our ever following rules in our use of language. Kripke writes that this paradox is "the most radical and original skeptical problem that philosophy has seen to date", and that Wittgenstein does not reject the argument that leads to the rule-following paradox, but accepts it and offers a "skeptical solution" to ameliorate the paradox's destructive effects.

Most commentators accept that Philosophical Investigations contains the rule-following paradox as Kripke presents it, but few have agreed with his attributing a skeptical solution to Wittgenstein. Kripke himself expresses doubts in Wittgenstein on Rules and Private Language as to whether Wittgenstein would endorse his interpretation of Philosophical Investigations. He says that the work should not be read as an attempt to give an accurate statement of Wittgenstein's views, but rather as an account of Wittgenstein's argument "as it struck Kripke, as it presented a problem for him".

The portmanteau "Kripkenstein" has been coined for Kripke's interpretation of Philosophical Investigations. Kripkenstein's main significance was a clear statement of a new kind of skepticism, dubbed "meaning skepticism": the idea that for isolated individuals there is no fact in virtue of which they mean one thing rather than another by the use of a word. Kripke's "skeptical solution" to meaning skepticism is to ground meaning in the behavior of a community.

Kripke's book generated a large secondary literature, divided between those who find his skeptical problem interesting and perceptive, and others, such as Gordon Baker, Peter Hacker, and Colin McGinn, who argue that his meaning skepticism is a pseudo-problem that stems from a confused, selective reading of Wittgenstein. Kripke's position has been defended against these and other attacks by the Cambridge philosopher Martin Kusch, and Wittgenstein scholar David G. Stern considers Kripke's book "the most influential and widely discussed" work on Wittgenstein since the 1980s.

Truth
In his 1975 article "Outline of a Theory of Truth", Kripke showed that a language can consistently contain its own truth predicate, something deemed impossible by Alfred Tarski, a pioneer in formal theories of truth. The approach involves letting truth be a partially defined property over the set of grammatically well-formed sentences in the language. Kripke showed how to do this recursively by starting from the set of expressions in a language that do not contain the truth predicate, and defining a truth predicate over just that segment: this action adds new sentences to the language, and truth is in turn defined for all of them. Unlike Tarski's approach, however, Kripke's lets "truth" be the union of all of these definition-stages; after a denumerable infinity of steps the language reaches a "fixed point" such that using Kripke's method to expand the truth-predicate does not change the language any further. Such a fixed point can then be taken as the basic form of a natural language containing its own truth predicate. But this predicate is undefined for any sentences that do not, so to speak, "bottom out" in simpler sentences not containing a truth predicate. That is, " 'Snow is white' is true" is well-defined, as is " ' "Snow is white" is true' is true," and so forth, but neither "This sentence is true" nor "This sentence is not true" receive truth-conditions; they are, in Kripke's terms, "ungrounded."

Gödel's first incompleteness theorem demonstrates that self-reference cannot be avoided naively, since propositions about seemingly unrelated objects (such as integers) can have an informal self-referential meaning, and this idea – manifested by the diagonal lemma – is the basis for Tarski's theorem that truth cannot be consistently defined. But Kripke's truth predicate does not give a truth value (true/false) to propositions such as the one built in Tarski's proof, since it is provable by induction that it is undefined at stage  for every finite .

Kripke's proposal is problematic in the sense that while the language contains a "truth" predicate of itself (at least a partial one), some of its sentences – such as the liar sentence ("this sentence is false") – have an undefined truth value, but the language does not contain its own "undefined" predicate. In fact it cannot, as that would create a new version of the liar paradox, the strengthened liar paradox ("this sentence is false or undefined"). Thus while the liar sentence is undefined in the language, the language cannot express that it is undefined.

Saul Kripke Center

The Saul Kripke Center at the Graduate Center of the City University of New York is dedicated to preserving and promoting Kripke's work. Its director is Romina Padro. The Saul Kripke Center holds events related to Kripke's work and is creating a digital archive of previously unpublished recordings of Kripke's lectures, lecture notes, and correspondence dating back to the 1950s. In his favorable review of Kripke's Philosophical Troubles, the Stanford philosopher Mark Crimmins wrote, "That four of the most admired and discussed essays in 1970s philosophy are here is enough to make this first volume of Saul Kripke's collected articles a must-have... The reader's delight will grow as hints are dropped that there is a great deal more to come in this series being prepared by Kripke and an ace team of philosopher-editors at the Saul Kripke Center at The Graduate Center of the City University of New York."

Works

 Naming and Necessity. Cambridge, Mass.: Harvard University Press, 1972. 
 Wittgenstein on Rules and Private Language: an Elementary Exposition. Cambridge, Mass.: Harvard University Press, 1982. . 
 Philosophical Troubles. Collected Papers Vol. 1. New York: Oxford University Press, 2011. 
 Reference and Existence – The John Locke Lectures. New York: Oxford University Press, 2013.

Awards and recognitions

Fulbright Scholar (1962–1963)
Society of Fellows, Harvard University (1963–1966).
Doctor of Humane Letters, honorary degree, University of Nebraska, 1977.
Fellow, American Academy of Arts and Sciences (1978–).
Corresponding Fellow, British Academy (1985–).
Howard Behrman Award, Princeton University, 1988.
Fellow, Academia Scientiarum et Artium Europaea (1993–).
Doctor of Humane Letters, honorary degree, Johns Hopkins University, 1997.
Doctor of Humane Letters, honorary degree, University of Haifa, Israel, 1998.
Fellow, Norwegian Academy of Sciences (2000–).
Schock Prize in Logic and Philosophy, Swedish Academy of Sciences, 2001.
Doctor of Humane Letters, honorary degree, University of Pennsylvania, 2005.
Fellow, American Philosophical Society (2005–).

See also

 American philosophy
 List of American philosophers
 Barry Kripke (a character on The Big Bang Theory who is believed to be named after Saul)

References

Further reading
 Arif Ahmed (2007), Saul Kripke. New York, NY; London: Continuum. .
 Alan Berger (editor) (2011) Saul Kripke. .
 Jonathan Berg (2014) Naming, Necessity and More: Explorations in the Philosophical Work of Saul Kripke. 
 Taylor Branch (August 14, 1977), "New Frontiers in American Philosophy". The New York Times Magazine.
 John Burgess (2013), Saul Kripke: Puzzles and Mysteries. .
 G. W. Fitch (2005), Saul Kripke. .
 Christopher Hughes (2004), Kripke : Names, Necessity, and Identity. .
 Paul W. Humphreys and James H. Fetzer (editors) (1998) The New Theory of Reference: Kripke, Marcus, and Its Origins 
 Martin Kusch (2006), A Sceptical Guide to Meaning and Rules: Defending Kripke's Wittgenstein. Acumben: Publishing Limited.
 Colin McGinn (1984), Wittgenstein on Meaning.  .
 Harold Noonan (2013), Routledge Philosophy Guidebook to Kripke and Naming and Necessity. 
 Christopher Norris (2007), Fiction, Philosophy and Literary Theory: Will the Real Saul Kripke Please Stand Up? London: Continuum
 Consuelo Preti (2002), On Kripke. Wadsworth. .
 Nathan Salmon (1981), Reference and Essence.  .
 Scott Soames (2002), Beyond Rigidity: The Unfinished Semantic Agenda of Naming and Necessity. .

External links

 CUNY Graduate Center Philosophy Department faculty page 
 Saul Kripke's archive on the CUNY Philosophy Commons
 Second Annual Saul Kripke Lecture by John Burgess on the Necessity of Origin at the CUNY Graduate Center, November 13th, 2012
 
 "Saul Kripke, Genius Logician", a short, non-technical interview by Andreas Saugstad, February 25, 2001.
 The conference in honor of Kripke's sixty-fifth birthday with a video of his speech "The First Person", January 25–26, 2006
 Video of his talk "From Church's Thesis to the First Order Algorithm Theorem," June 13, 2006.
 Podcast of his talk "Unrestricted Exportation and Some Morals for the Philosophy of Language,"  May 21, 2008.
 London Review of Books article by Jerry Fodor discussing Kripke's work 
 Celebrating CUNY's Genius Philosopher, by Gary Shapiro, January 27, 2006, in The New York Sun.
 information from 'Wisdom Supreme' website
 A New York Times article about his 65th birthday
 Roundtable on Kripke's critique of mind-body identity with Scott Soames as the main presenter May 26, 2010.

1940 births
2022 deaths
20th-century American Jews
20th-century American male writers
20th-century American philosophers
20th-century essayists
21st-century American Jews
21st-century American male writers
21st-century American philosophers
21st-century essayists
American logicians
American male essayists
American male non-fiction writers
American metaphysics writers
American people of Lithuanian-Jewish descent
American philosophy academics
Analytic philosophers
Computability theorists
Corresponding Fellows of the British Academy
Epistemologists
Harvard University alumni
Historians of philosophy
Jewish American academics
Jewish American writers
Jewish philosophers
Jews and Judaism in Omaha, Nebraska
Saul
Mathematicians from New York (state)
Members of the European Academy of Sciences and Arts
Members of the Norwegian Academy of Science and Letters
Metaphysicians
Modal logicians
Omaha Central High School alumni
Ontologists
People from Bay Shore, New York
Philosophers from Nebraska
Philosophers from New York (state)
Philosophers of history
Philosophers of Judaism
Philosophers of language
Philosophers of logic
Philosophers of mathematics
Philosophers of mind
Princeton University faculty
Rolf Schock Prize laureates
Set theorists
Wittgensteinian philosophers
Writers from Omaha, Nebraska
Fulbright alumni
Deaths from pancreatic cancer